Christian College, Chengannur (CCC) is a government aided college for higher education located at Angadickal Chengannur, Alappuzha district, Kerala, India. It was established in 1964 by Rt. Rev. Dr. Mathews Mar Athanasius. The college is owned and operated by Malankara Marthoma Syrian Church and affiliated with Kerala University. The NAAC Accredited B++ Grade College has 9 departments offering various graduate and post graduate courses. Notable alumni of the college include Saji Cherian and ex-MLA KK Ramachandran Nair.

Departments

Science

Physics
Chemistry
Zoology

Mathematics
Botany

Arts

English

Economics

History
Commerce

Accreditation
The college is  recognized by the University Grants Commission (UGC).

References

External links
http://www.christiancollege.ac.in

Universities and colleges in Alappuzha district
Educational institutions established in 1964
1964 establishments in Kerala
Arts and Science colleges in Kerala
Colleges affiliated to the University of Kerala